Álvaro Anyiver Angulo Mosquera (born 6 March 1997) is a Colombian footballer who currently plays as a defender for Atlético Nacional.

International career
Angulo made his debut for the Colombia national team on 16 January 2022 in a 2–1 home win over Honduras.

Career statistics

Club

Notes

References

1997 births
Living people
Colombian footballers
Association football defenders
Deportivo Pasto footballers
Águilas Doradas Rionegro players
Categoría Primera A players
Sportspeople from Nariño Department